Anterior cruciate ligament reconstruction (ACL reconstruction) is a surgical tissue graft replacement of the anterior cruciate ligament, located in the knee, to restore its function after an injury. The torn ligament can either be removed from the knee (most common), or preserved (where the graft is passed inside the preserved ruptured native ligament) before reconstruction through an arthroscopic procedure. ACL repair is also a surgical option. This involves repairing the ACL by re-attaching it, instead of performing a reconstruction. Theoretical advantages of repair include faster recovery and a lack of donor site morbidity, but randomised controlled trials and long-term data regarding re-rupture rates using contemporary surgical techniques are lacking.

Background
The Anterior Cruciate Ligament is the ligament that keeps the knee stable. Anterior Cruciate Ligament damage is a very common injury, especially among athletes. Anterior Cruciate Ligament Reconstruction (ACL) surgery is a common intervention. 1 in every 3,000 American ruptures their ACL and between 100,000 and 300,000 reconstruction surgeries will be performed each year in the United States. Around $500 million health care dollar will come from ACL injuries. ACL injuries can be categorized into groups- contact and non-contact based on the nature of the injury  Contact injuries occur when a person or object come into contact with the knee causing the ligament to tear. However, non-contact tears typically occur during the following movements: decelerating, cutting, or landing from a jump. ACL injury is 4-6 times higher in females than in males. ACL injuries account for a quarter of all knee injuries in the high school population. An increased Q angle and hormonal differences are a few examples of the gender disparity in ACL tear rates.

Types of grafts 

Graft options for ACL reconstruction include:

Autografts (employing bone or tissue harvested from the patient's body).
Allografts (using bone or tissue from another body, either a cadaver or a live donor).
Bridge-enhanced ACL repair (using a bio-engineered bridging scaffold injected with the patient's own blood).
Synthetic tissue for ACL reconstruction has also been developed, but little data exists on its strength and reliability.

Autograft 
An accessory hamstring or part of the patellar ligament are the most common donor tissues used in autografts. While originally less commonly utilized, the quadriceps tendon has become a more popular graft.

Because the tissue used in an autograft is the patient's own, the risk of rejection is minimal. The retear rate in young, active individuals has been shown to be lower when using autograft as compared to allograft.

Hamstring tendon 

Hamstring autografts are made with the semitendinosus tendon, either alone or accompanied by the gracilis tendon for a stronger graft. The semitendinosus is an accessory hamstring (the primary hamstrings are left intact), and the gracilis is not a hamstring, but an accessory adductor (the primary adductors are left intact as well). The two tendons are commonly combined and referred to as a four-strand hamstring graft, made by a long piece (about 25 cm) removed from each tendon. The tendon segments are folded and braided together to form a tendon of quadruple thickness for the graft. The braided segment is threaded through the heads of the tibia and femur, and its ends are fixed with screws on the opposite sides of the two bones.

Unlike the patellar ligament, the hamstring tendon's fixation to the bone can be affected by motion after surgery. Therefore, a brace is often used to immobilize the knee for one to two weeks. Evidence suggests that the hamstring tendon graft does as well, or nearly as well, as the patellar ligament graft in the long term. Common problems during recovery include strengthening of the quadriceps, IT-band, and calf muscles.

The main surgical wound is over the upper proximal tibia, which prevents the typical pain experienced when kneeling after surgery. The wound is typically smaller than that of a patellar ligament graft, and so causes less post-operative pain. Another option first described in 2004, a minimally invasive technique for harvesting from the back of the knee, is faster, produces a significantly smaller wound, avoids the complications of graft harvesting from the anterior incision, and decreases the risk of nerve injury.

There is some controversy as to how well a hamstring tendon regenerates after the harvesting. Most studies suggest that the tendon can be regenerated at least partially, though it will still be weaker than the original tendon.

Advantages of hamstring grafts include their high "load to failure" strength, the stiffness of the graft, and the low postoperative morbidity. The natural ACL can withstand a load of up to 2,160 newtons. With a hamstring graft, this number doubles, decreasing the risk of re-injury. The stiffness of a hamstring graft—quadruple that of the natural ACL (Bartlett, Clatworthy and Ngugen, 2001)—also reduces the risk of re-injury.

Patellar tendon 

The patellar tendon connects the patella (kneecap) to the tibia (shin). The graft is normally taken from the injured knee, but in some circumstances, such as a second operation, the other knee may be used. The middle third of the tendon is used, with bone fragments removed on each end. The graft is then threaded through holes drilled in the tibia and femur, and screwed into place. It is slightly larger than a hamstring graft.

Disadvantages compared with a hamstring graft include:
 Increased wound pain  
 Increased scar formation
 Risk of fracturing the patella during harvesting of the graft
 Increased risk of tendinitis.
 Increased pain levels, even years after surgery, with activities that require kneeling. 
Some or all of these disadvantages may be attributable to post-operative patellar tendon shortening.

The rehabilitation after the surgery is different for each knee.  The beginning rehab for the ACL graft knee is focused on reducing swelling, gaining full range of motion, and stimulating the leg muscles. The goal for the graft donor need is to immediately start high repetition strength training exercises.

Allograft 
The patellar ligament, tibialis anterior tendon, or Achilles tendon may be recovered from a cadaver and used in ACL reconstruction. The Achilles tendon, because of its large size, must be shaved to fit within the joint cavity.

Choice of graft

Type
Typically, age and lifestyle help determine the type of graft used for ACL reconstruction. The biggest factors in knee stability are correct graft placement by the surgeon and treatment of other menisco-ligament injuries in the knee, rather than type of graft. However, with the current literature, only KT-1000 arthrometer assessment demonstrated more laxity with allograft reconstruction. Bone-patellar tendon-bone grafts have resulted fewer failures and more stability on KT-1000 arthrometer testing.

Site
No ideal graft site for ACL reconstruction exists. Surgeons have historically regarded patellar tendon grafts as the "gold standard" for knee stability.

Hamstring autografts have failed at a higher rate than bone-tendon-bone autografts, after short- to mid-term followup of primary ACL reconstruction. However, the observed difference in failure rates is small enough that both are still regarded as viable options for primary ACL reconstruction.

Hamstring grafts historically had problems with fixation slippage and stretching out over time. Modern fixation methods avoid graft slippage and produce similarly stable outcomes with easier rehabilitation, less anterior knee pain and less joint stiffness.

Although there is less experience with the use of tibialis anterior grafts, preliminary data has shown no difference in short-term subjective outcomes between tibialis anterior allografts and patellar tendon allografts.

The quadriceps tendon, while historically reserved for revision reconstructions, has enjoyed a renewed focus as a versatile and durable graft for primary reconstructions. Use of the quadriceps tendon usually does not result in the same degree of anterior knee pain postoperatively, and quadriceps tendon harvest produces a reliably thick, robust graft. The quadriceps tendon has approximately 20% greater collagen per cross-sectional area than the patellar tendon, and a greater diameter of usable soft tissue is available.

Bridge Enhanced ACL Restoration (BEAR Implant) 
A new approach to treating ACL tears was developed at Boston Children's Hospital and is currently in clinical trials. The Bridge Enhanced ACL Restoration (BEAR) implant is a bio-engineered bridging implant that is injected with a small amount of patient's own blood to stimulate healing and reconnection of the ACL. Results from the first-in-human study published in March 2019 in the Orthopedic Journal of Sports Medicine showed the 10 patients who received the BEAR implant had similar clinical, functional and patient-reported outcomes as the 10 patients undergoing autograft ACL reconstruction. Additional clinical studies are underway.

Ligament Advanced Reinforcement System (LARS)

The anterior cruciate ligament (ACL) of the knee is commonly injured. There is insufficient re-vascularization of the ligament after complete rupture, which limits its ability to heal and necessitates reconstruction surgery. Within the last 20 years, new types of synthetic ligaments have been developed. The Ligament Advanced Reinforcement System (LARS), is one of these new synthetic ligaments that has recently gained popularity. There is evidence that supports LARS as a viable option for reconstruction surgery in regards to complication rates and high patient satisfaction scores, when compared to traditional surgical techniques.  However, systematic reviews of the LARS in regarding graft stability and long term functional outcomes, have highlighted several important gaps in existing literature that requires future investigation. The necessity of rehabilitation following LARS is well recognized, but there is limited evidence available that guide rehabilitation protocols.

Stem cell treatment 
Autologous stem-cell transplantation using mesenchymal stem cells (MSCs) has been used to improve recovery time from ACL surgery, especially for athletes. MSCs are multipotent stem cells, meaning they can differentiate into multiple cell types. In the case of mesenchymal stem cells, these cell types include osteoblasts (bone cells), adipocytes (fat cells), and chondrocytes (cartilage cells). Ligament tissue mainly consists of fibroblasts and extracellular matrix. Ligament cells differ in size, respond to different cues in the cell environment, and express different cell surface markers, limiting the number of clinical treatments for accelerated repair of ACL tissue to MSCs and primary fibroblasts obtained from other ACL tissue. Therefore, most modern stem cell injections use MSCs to promote faster repair of the ACL and allow people such as athletes to return to their previous form faster.

In order for MSCs to differentiate into an ACL, they must be placed in a proper scaffold on which to grow, and must be in a bioreactor that maintains a normal physiological environment for the cells to reproduce and proliferate effectively. The scaffold must have the mechanical properties of a healthy ACL to sustain the ligament while it is in its primary form and maintain normal knee movement. Scaffolds that are used for ACL growth include collagen, silk, gelatin, polylactic acid, and glycosaminoglycans. Mechanical properties of the scaffolds are further enhanced through braiding and twisting of the scaffold materials.

The bioreactor must have similar properties to a knee joint so that when the ACL is inserted into the body, it is not rejected as foreign, which could cause infection. Therefore, it has to have compatible pH levels, oxygen concentration levels, metabolite levels and temperature, in addition to being sterile.

Recovery 
Initial physical therapy consists of range of motion (ROM) exercises, often with the guidance of a physical therapist. Range of motion exercises are used to regain the flexibility of the ligament, prevent or break down scar tissue from forming and reduce loss of muscle tone. Range of motion exercise examples include: quadriceps contractions and straight leg raises. In some cases, a continuous passive motion (CPM) device is used immediately after surgery to help with flexibility. The preferred method of preventing muscle loss is isometric exercises that put zero strain on the knee.  Knee extension within two weeks is important with many rehab guidelines.

Perturbation training can help improve gait asymmetries of the knee joint.

Approximately six weeks is required for the bone to attach to the graft. However, the patient can typically walk on their own and perform simple physical tasks prior to this with caution, relying on the surgical fixation of the graft until true healing (graft attachment to bone) has taken place. At this stage, the first round of physical therapy can begin. This usually consists of careful exercises to regain flexibility and small amounts of strength.  One of the more important benchmarks in recovery is the twelve weeks post-surgery period. After this, the patient can typically begin a more aggressive regimen of exercises involving stress on the knee, and increasing resistance. Jogging may be incorporated as well.

After four months, more intense activities such as running are possible without risk. After five months, light ball work may commence as the ligament is nearly regenerated. After six months, the reconstructed ACL is generally at full strength (ligament tissue has fully regrown), and the patient may return to activities involving cutting and twisting if a brace is worn. Recovery varies highly from case to case, and sometimes resumption of stressful activities may take a year or longer.

Risks
If the proper rehabilitation procedure is not followed out post surgery, the ACL becomes less mobile and the bones begin to rub against each other. The abnormal bone movement can also damage the tissue, this damage can lead to osteoarthritis.

Rehabilitation 

The recovery process for the ACL is usually broken down into different phases of rehabilitation. Each phase has its own objectives, however is intertwined with other phases since the goals are as progressive as the recovery itself. The rehabilitation process is at the pace of the patient. Timelines are sometimes given to help give an idea of where one can be during rehabilitation. Timelines are not used to discourage or encourage those who aren't ready to advance their recovery process. Such acts may cause serious injury or re-injury of the ACL.

Phase 1 
This phase begins immediately post surgery while the patient is still on crutches and in a removable knee brace, which they're projected to be using for seven to ten days. During this phase the patient will begin seeing a physical therapist that will discuss the main goals of rehabilitation. Some of these goals include: reducing pain and inflammation, increasing range of motion, strengthening surrounding muscles, and beginning weight bearing exercises. Generally, in Phase 1 strengthening consists of isometric exercises. Extension deficit is a frequent issue after surgery and is often related to arthrogenic muscle inhibition. Specific exercises and cryotherapy are proven to be effective in addressing arthrogenic muscle inhibition. If the patient used a patellar tendon graft for their reconstructed ACL, therapist will also work on mobilizing the patellar tendon to keep it from shortening.

Some equipment that can be used and exercises that can be performed are:
 Use of Cryo-cuff
- provides cold compression
 Isometric Contraction of Quads
 Quad Sets 
- stand against wall, push extended knee against rolled towel
- progress to straight leg raised to 30deg. 
 Wall Slides
- To increase knee flexion
 Assisted Knee Flexion
 Towel Squeeze 
- Sit in chair, squeeze rolled towel between knees for 5 seconds. Relax & repeat.
 VMO Strengthening Exercise
 Supported Bilateral Calf-Raises
 walk without crutches
 Swimming (Freestyle front crawl)

This particular swimming technique encompasses all the muscles in the knee and will increase not only mobility but also the strength of the surrounding muscles, which include the quadriceps, hamstrings, gastrocnemius, tibialis anterior (shin muscle), abductor hallucis, abductor digiti minimi, and flexor digitorum brevis (foot muscles).

Phase 2 
Many of the goals from phase I will be continued to the following phases until they have been reached. Some of these goals are reducing pain, swelling, and increasing the knee's range of motion is still crucial during this phase. Physical therapist may begin to incorporate core exercises as well as light weight exercises to strengthen the surrounding muscles and hips. Some examples of these exercises include the usage of resistance/stretch bands, stationary biking, and elliptical. During this phase the patient may begin performing more strenuous exercises such as half-squatting and partial lunges.

Some exercises that can be performed are:
 Mini squats 
- Progress to full squats → single-leg half squat 
 Mini Lunges
- Progress to full lunges
 Leg Press 
- Double-leg → single
 Step-ups

 Bridges
- Double-leg → single
- Floor → Swiss ball
 Hip Abduction w/ Theraband
 Hip Extension w/ Theraband
 Wobble board
- Assisted → un-assisted → eyes closed (assisted → unassisted)
 Stork Stand
- Assisted → un-assisted → eyes closed (assisted → unassisted) → unstable surface
 Static Proprioceptive hold/ball throwing
 Functional Exercises that can be performed at this time include:
- Walking
- Bike
- Roman Chair

Phase 3 

Patients will continue to work on decreasing pain/swelling and building up their strength. Lateral movement, jogging in a straight line, single-leg squats and exercises will start to be incorporated as patient begins to regain confidence in the knee. Building strength in the hips with lateral stepping as well as step-ups and step-downs will still be a strong focus in this phase.

Some exercises that can be performed are:
 Continue exercises from Phase 2, progress as necessary
 Jump & Land drills
- Jump from block & stick landing
- Double-leg landing → single-leg
 Plyometric Drills
- Jumping over blocks, sideways & forward
- Hopping up & down steps/stairs

Phase 4 
By this time the range of motion should be greater than 110 degrees flexed and the patient's bodily mechanics like walking and light jogging should be back to normal (before operation). Single leg exercises will be continued as well as balancing activities to strengthen the core and lower body. Stamina and endurance should be improved for exercises such as: biking, jogging, and step-ups/downs. If by this time the patient does not have 110 degrees of flexion in the knee, they are advised to see their therapist or surgeon. There's a chance that the knee could need another operation to increase the elasticity of the ligament. 

The goal of this phase is a return to activity, however it requires an ability to perform some functional performance tests such as:
 Agility Tests
Illinois Agility Test
Zig Zag Agility Test
These tests are used to test the ability of the knee to withstand cutting and planting maneuvers.
 Single Leg Step-Down Tests
 These tests can be used to identify any hip and core musculature weaknesses before cleared for return-to-play.
 Standing Vertical Jump
The patient jumps straight in the air from a standing start and lands on two feet as stable as possible.
 Heiden Hop Test
The patient jumps as far as possible with the uninjured leg and lands on the injured leg. A patient's ability to stick the landing is indicative of good knee function.
 Isokinetic Testing
This is used to evaluate muscle strength. 
The individual should have at least 90% quadricep strength of the uninjured leg.
They should also have equal hamstring strength to their uninjured leg as well.

Phase 5 
This is the last phase of the recovery rehabilitation. Phase V includes returning to sports after being cleared by therapist or surgeon. In order for this to happen the patient must have full range of motion, continue maintaining strength and endurance, and be able to increase proprioception with agility drills. Patient is still to be aware that going down hill or down stairs while the knee is aggravated may cause further injury like a meniscus tear.

Cost of procedure 
The cost of an ACL reconstruction surgery will vary due to a few different reasons such as where a patient lives, which graft is used, if the meniscus is also torn, and the coverage of the patient's insurance. A study has shown in 2016 that metropolitan areas, of at least one million residents, located on the western coast of the United States of America and areas like Minnesota, Indiana, and Michigan were more expensive than the East and South East coast of the United States. Another study, conducted by Baylor University, found that ACL reconstruction procedures using the bone-patella tendon-bone technique took 2.5 hours longer than using a hamstring graft. The operation room costs and hospital charges for that amount of extra time came to about $1,580 more expensive. This also applies to having a torn meniscus during the procedure. Fixing the torn cartilage will increase the procedure time, increasing cost. Insurance plays the biggest role in cost for an ACL reconstruction since that it will be covering majority of the costs. The coverage of a patient's plan, deductibles, and insurance company will determine how much the patient will pay in copays.

Despite the complexity of the procedure and numerous doctor's visits involved, 80–90% of patients who have had the surgery said they had favorable results.

References 

Orthopedic surgical procedures
Knee treatments
Knee ligaments